The Ocean State Waves are a collegiate summer baseball team based in South Kingstown, Rhode Island, United States. The team, a member of the New England Collegiate Baseball League, plays its home games at Old Mountain Field in South Kingstown.

Postseason appearances

References

New England Collegiate Baseball League teams
Amateur baseball teams in Rhode Island
South Kingstown, Rhode Island
2013 establishments in Rhode Island
Baseball teams established in 2013